Tedaniidae is a family of sponges belonging to the order Poecilosclerida.

Genera:
 Hemitedania Hallmann, 1914
 Strongylamma Hallmann, 1917
 Tedania Gray, 1867
 Trachytedania Ridley, 1881

References

Sponge families